The combination of the Bravo and Zulu nautical signal flags, i.e., Bravo Zulu, also referred to as "BZ," is a naval signal, typically conveyed by flaghoist or voice radio, meaning "Well Done" with regard to actions, operations or performance.  In addition to the British Royal Navy, it has also been used as part of vernacular slang within the U.S. Navy, NATO, and other Allied naval forces. It can be combined with the "negative" signal, spoken or written as NEGAT, to say "NEGAT Bravo Zulu" to convey "not well done" for a given action.

"BZ" is widely used as shorthand vernacular amongst members of the sea services (i.e., navies, Marines, and those coast guards that are military services versus civilian agencies). In the Royal Navy, when the sovereign wishes to reward the crew of a British warship with the order to "splice the mainbrace," i.e., providing the crew with an additional rum ration, it is ordinarily followed simply with the signal or statement "Bravo Zulu."

History

According to the "Navy Data" reference website operated by the U.S. Navy: "The term BRAVO ZULU originates from the  Allied Tactical Publication 1 (ATP 1), an Allied military maritime tactical signals publication, which in the aggregate is For Official Use Only (FOUO), now known in the U.S. Department of Defense as Controlled Unclassified Information (CUI), and can also be found in Multinational Maritime Tactical Publication 2 (MTP 2). Signals are sent as letters and/or numbers, which have meanings by themselves sometimes or in certain combinations. A single table in ATP 1 is called 'governing groups,' that is, the entire signal that follows the governing group is to be performed according to the 'governor.' The letter 'B' indicates this table, and the second letter (A through Z) gives more specific information. (do whatever the rest of the flashing light, flag hoist or radio transmission says). 'BZ' happens to be the last item of the governing groups table and it means 'well done'."

"Bravo Zulu" is also defined by the Allied Naval Signal Book (ACP 175 series), an international naval signal code adopted after the North Atlantic Treaty Organization (NATO) was created during 1949.  Until then, each navy in NATO had used its own separate signal code and operational manuals. World War II experience had shown that it was difficult or impossible for ships of different navies to operate together unless they could communicate readily and the implementation of ACP 175 was designed to remedy this.

Personal congratulations
In addition to flaghoist and military voice radio, use of the term BRAVO ZULU has also been extended in contemporary times to include written correspondence, message traffic and email traffic from Royal Navy, Royal Marines, Royal Australian Navy, Royal Canadian Navy, Canadian Coast Guard, U.S. Navy, U.S. Marine Corps, U.S. Coast Guard, National Oceanographic and Atmospheric Administration, and U.S. Public Health Service commissioned officers in command or in senior supervisory positions (e.g., captains and flag officers in the Navy, Coast Guard, and colonels and general officers in the Marine Corps) to congratulate or otherwise compliment colleagues, contemporaries, or juniors, the latter to include their subordinate crews or commands, for outstanding performance.

See also
International maritime signal flags

References

Military slang and jargon
United States Navy traditions